Hafer is a surname. Notable people with the surname include:

Barbara Hafer (born 1943), U.S politician from the U.S State of Pennsylvania
Christoph Hafer (born 1992), German bobsledder
Dick Hafer (1927–2012), American jazz tenor saxophonist born in Wyomissing, Pennsylvania
Dick Hafer (comics) (1937–2003), American comics artist
Jack Hafer, film producer
John J. Hafer (born 1932) represented District 1 in the Maryland Senate

See also
Haffner (disambiguation)
Hafner (disambiguation)
Schaefer

German-language surnames
Occupational surnames